= Houselink Community Homes =

Canadian non-profit organization

- Type: NGO, charity
- Region served: Toronto, Ontario, Canada
- Website: houselink.on.ca

Houselink Community Homes, commonly abbreviated to simply Houselink, is a community housing agency and non-profit organization that provides housing and services for the disadvantaged and those with mental illness in Toronto, Ontario, Canada.

Houselink provides assistance to those on the margins of society who traditionally have limited access to housing and to the services offered by the agency.

The agency has individual houses and buildings across the city that accommodate the special needs of those requiring help.

As of April 1, Houselink has amalgamated with Mainstay Housing to become Houselink & Mainstay Inc.

== Mission ==
The stated mission of Houselink is as follows: "to improve the quality of life of psychiatric consumers / survivors including those who are homeless or otherwise marginalized, through the provision of permanent affordable supportive housing and programs."

Houselink works from a recovery framework which emphasizes optimal wellness for each member.

Houselink owns over 22 buildings and leases more than 125 other units throughout the city.

== Services ==
=== Drop-ins ===
Houselink offers a drop-in service that allows members to join others in the community for an almost daily get-together where members have access to laptop computers, community kitchens and other events.

=== Social-Recreation Committee ===
The Houselink Social-Recreation Committee organizes and administrates the recreational and social adventures of Houselink members. Outings include an annual camping trip and in-town adventures including trips to the Canadian National Exhibition and strawberry-picking.

=== The Link ===
The Link is a quarterly publication written entirely by consumer/survivors of the mental health system. It contains articles, poems, stories and other written work of interest to the Houselink recovery community.

=== Other services ===
Additional opportunities for community involvement include Families Moving Forward, Member Development and Education on responsible Environmental Issues towards waste and a sustainable future. Member Employment and Health and Wellness.

== Leadership ==
The Executive Director of Houselink is Brian Davis.

Peggy Birnberg, formerly Houselink's executive director, died on February 8, 2013.

== See also ==
Recovery housing
